Pusillina sarsii is a species of minute sea snail, a marine gastropod mollusk or micromollusk in the family Rissoidae.

Description

Distribution

References

 de Kluijver, M. J.; Ingalsuo, S. S.; de Bruyne, R. H. (2000). Macrobenthos of the North Sea [CD-ROM]: 1. Keys to Mollusca and Brachiopoda. World Biodiversity Database CD-ROM Series. Expert Center for Taxonomic Identification (ETI): Amsterdam, The Netherlands. ISBN 3-540-14706-3. 1 cd-rom.
 Warén, A. (1996). Ecology and Systematics of the North European species of Rissoa and Pusillina (Prosobranchia: Rissoidae). Journal of the Marine biological Association of the UK. 76: 1013-1059

External links
 Lovén, S. L. (1846). Index Molluscorum litora Scandinaviae occidentalia habitantium. Öfversigt af Kongliga Vetenskaps Akademiens Förhandlingar. (1846): 134-160, 182-204.
 Gofas, S.; Le Renard, J.; Bouchet, P. (2001). Mollusca. in: Costello, M.J. et al. (eds), European Register of Marine Species: a check-list of the marine species in Europe and a bibliography of guides to their identification. Patrimoines Naturels. 50: 180-213

Rissoidae
Gastropods described in 1846